Norway High School was a high school located in the town of Norway, Iowa. It was closed after the 1990–1991 school year, and the majority of students were merged into Benton Community High School. The school's final baseball season was the subject of the movie The Final Season.

Baseball program
The storied Norway High School baseball team amassed twenty Iowa state titles, with the first coming in 1965, and the last in their final season in 1991. Norway competed in the 1A class, the class for the smallest of school districts, of Iowa high school athletics. Their final season was coached by Kent Stock, who took over for a retiring Jim Van Scoyoc, who had previously won three state coach of the year awards, and one national coach of the year award.

Notable alumni
 Mike Boddicker - Former MLB player 
 Bruce Kimm - Former MLB player, coach, and manager
 Hal Trosky - Former MLB player

References

External links 
 Norway Baseball - Movie Tie-in Website
 The Final Season - Official Movie Website

Educational institutions disestablished in 1991
Defunct schools in Iowa
Norwegian-American culture in Iowa
Schools in Benton County, Iowa
1991 disestablishments in Iowa